The year 2004 is the fourth year in the history of Deep, a mixed martial arts promotion based in Japan. In 2004 Deep held 9 events beginning with, Deep: 13th Impact.

Title fights

Events list

Deep: 13th Impact

Deep: 13th Impact was an event held on January 22, 2004, in Tokyo.

Results

Deep: clubDeep Fukuoka: Team Roken Festival

Deep: clubDeep Fukuoka: Team Roken Festival was an event held on March 20, 2004, at The TNC Broadcast Paveria Hall in Fukuoka, Tokyo.

Results

Deep: 14th Impact

Deep: 14th Impact was an event held on April 18, 2004, at The Umeda Stella Hall in Osaka.

Results

Deep: 15th Impact

Deep: 15th Impact was an event held on July 3, 2004, at Differ Ariake in Tokyo, Japan.

Results

Deep: Chonan Festival

Deep: Chonan Festival was an event held on October 3, 2004, at Mikawa Town Gymnasium in Mikawa.

Results

Deep: clubDeep Toyama: Barbarian Festival 1

Deep: clubDeep Toyama: Barbarian Festival 1 was an event held on October 24, 2004, at Toyama Event Plaza in Toyama.

Results

Deep: 16th Impact

Deep: 16th Impact was an event held on October 30, 2004, at Korakuen Hall in Tokyo, Japan.

Results

Deep: clubDeep Osaka

Deep: clubDeep Osaka was an event held on November 28, 2004, at Delfin Arena in Osaka.

Results

Deep: 17th Impact

Deep: 17th Impact was an event held on December 18, 2004, at Differ Ariake in Tokyo.

Results

See also 
 Deep
 List of Deep champions
 List of Deep events

References

Deep (mixed martial arts) events
2004 in mixed martial arts